The 2007 FIA GT RAC Tourist Trophy was the second round of the 2007 FIA GT Championship season.  It took place at Silverstone Circuit on May 6, 2007. It was the third time the RAC Tourist Trophy was held as a round of the FIA GT Championship.

Official results
Class winners in bold.  Cars failing to complete 75% of winner's distance marked as Not Classified (NC).  Cars with a C under their class are running in the Citation Cup, with the winner marked in bold italics.

Statistics
 Pole Position – #5 Carsport Holland – 1:43.504
 Average Speed – 167.74 km/h

External links
 Official FIA GT website – Race Results

T
Tourist Trophy
RAC Tourist Trophy